Welbeck Defence Sixth Form College (stylised as Welbeck – The Defence Sixth Form College), formerly named and often referred to as simply Welbeck College, was an independent, selective sixth form college in Leicestershire, England. While run as a sixth form college, the school was an institution of the Ministry of Defence and part of the Defence Academy of the United Kingdom.

Founded in 1953, the school was originally based at Welbeck Abbey, where it provided A-level education for boys planning to join the technical branches of the British Army. By 2004, the school accepted both male and female students for all three branches of the armed forces and in 2005, the school was re-opened and relocated to a purpose-built site in Leicestershire, where it also began admitting potential civil servants for the Defence Engineering and Science Group within the Ministry of Defence. The school closed on 3 July 2021.

History

Foundation 

Recognising a decline in the number of cadets passing to Royal Military Academy Sandhurst, particularly from the north of England, in 1951 the Army Council appointed a committee to consider ways to attract young boys to take commissions in the army. The committee concluded that either a system of scholarships should be established to encourage boys to stay at school until they were 18 before graduating to Sandhurst, or that the army should open a school of its own. The second method was preferred by the council, who appointed a second committee which selected Welbeck Abbey—previously an army college for adults—as the site for the new school. The report was approved by the council, and in the autumn of 1952, work commenced to convert the abbey, which was let by the Duke of Portland to the Ministry of Defence, into a teaching facility.

Following several meetings throughout September 1953 to finalise some last details, Welbeck College, The Army Sixth Form was officially opened on 25 September 1953.

Expansion and re-opening 

In 1992, female students were permitted to join the school for the first time.

In 2002, the Defence Training Review resulted in a decision to expand the school to accommodate candidates for the engineering branches of the Royal Navy and the Royal Air Force, starting from 2004. Having operated out of Welbeck Abbey for half a century, the review also resulted in the decision to close the school at the abbey and open a new Defence Sixth Form College on the site of some disused barracks outside Woodhouse, near Loughborough.

The purpose-built site was selected for its proximity to the M1 and the East Midlands Airport, and reportedly cost £38 million to develop. The school officially re-opened as Welbeck – The Defence Sixth Form College on 7 December 2005. Upon its re-opening, the school continued to admit potential officers for all three branches of the armed forces as it had started doing the year prior, and began admitting potential civil servants for the Defence Engineering and Science Group (DESG) within the Ministry of Defence.

Closure 
On 11 March 2019, it was announced in the House of Commons that the school would be closed in 2021. A spokesperson for the Ministry of Defence acknowledged that the school had "produced some excellent young graduates" but said that the school was "not meeting Defence's requirements or providing sufficient value for money".

In a parliamentary debate called by then-Conservative MP Nicky Morgan on 30 April 2019, Defence minister Mark Lancaster said that "the scheme as it stands has consistently failed to deliver the required number of engineers and technical officers to Defence since its establishment in 2005" and that "on average only 53 per cent of entrants have completed [the scheme] successfully, and a proportion of those have not achieved STEM degrees". He also noted that "the scheme has cost the Ministry of Defence and the taxpayer some £200,000 per student who has become a STEM graduate".

The school was officially closed at the final graduation ceremony on 3 July 2021, which was attended by Princess Anne.

Governance 
Although run as a sixth form college, the school was an institution of the Ministry of Defence and part of the Defence Academy of the United Kingdom, and operated by Minerva Ltd as part of a public–private partnership.

It was governed by a board including senior armed forces personnel, civil servants, individuals with technical and industrial experience, directors of Minerva, as well as staff and parents. The board acted as an advisory, rather than a proprietorial body, overseeing the day-to-day running of the school, the facilities, and the provision of education and pastoral care. There were two sub-committees—academic and pastoral, and facilities—which reported to the main governing board.

The school was an associate of the Headmasters' and Headmistresses' Conference (HMC).

Admissions 
As a selective school, it required prospective pupils to satisfy one of the Single Service Selection Boards and meet minimum academic requirements. Candidates had to be British citizens, or hold dual-nationality with one being British. Candidates were required to have an A grade in GCSE maths (or equivalent), a B grade in the equivalent level science, and a C grade in the equivalent level English language. A 2018 Independent Schools Inspectorate report noted that pupils at the school came from a very diverse range of backgrounds from across the United Kingdom. A similar report in 2014 noted that just under a quarter of the students were girls.

A small number of private pupils were admitted annually, who paid £6,900 per term during 2019/2020, although the majority of students were classified as 'sponsored students' and had their tuition fees paid for by the Ministry of Defence. All students' parents were expected to contribute toward maintenance costs, including board, lodging, uniform, and any other services provided, though the amount varied based on gross annual household income and several other factors.

Curriculum

Structure 

Aiming to prepare students for careers in the armed forces, the school focused primarily on science, technology, engineering, and mathematics (STEM) subjects, and, shortly before its closure, offered a choice of 11 core subjects. Before its closure, all students were required to take four AS-levels in lower-sixth, including mathematics and physics, and all had to continue mathematics at A-level in their final year. An enrichment programme was also available, whereby students could attain additional qualifications such as developing language skills or completing an Extended Project Qualification (EPQ).

A 2018 Independent Schools Inspectorate (ISI) report noted that A-level results from 2014 to 2016 were above the national average for sixth formers in maintained schools, similar to the 2014 ISI report which further found that over two-thirds of results were graded A* to B in 2013. Pupils of the school were given preferred entry to the Defence Technical Undergraduate Scheme (DTUS), which aimed to further prepare students for careers in the armed forces. Pupils typically went on to read science, engineering or management degrees at one of 11 universities on the scheme.

Combined Cadet Force 

Unlike most schools, participation in the school's combined cadet force (CCF) was a compulsory part of the curriculum for all students. The school CCF did not follow the usual cadet training programme, instead holding sessions twice per week and placing more emphasis on skills and leadership, in order to better prepare students for officer training.

The school CCF held an annual passing out parade to an audience of family, friends and invited guests. Awards were given to the best cadet from each section and two special awards—the Welbeck Sword of Honour and the Prince Philip Medal—were also presented.

Extracurricular activities 
A wide range of sports were offered at the school, and students participated in regional and military sporting events. In addition to compulsory sports and CCF activities, students were required to participate in at least one further activity per week from a range of sporting and non-sporting options. These activities included local volunteering as well as participation in The Duke of Edinburgh's Award programme.

School site 

The school had a purpose-built site outside Woodhouse, near Loughborough, from its re-opening in 2005 until its closure in 2021. Built on the site of some disused army barracks, the site was close to both the M1 and the East Midlands Airport, and reportedly developed at a cost of £38 million. The school buildings were grouped into four distinct zones adjacent to a large area of sports fields, and included dining facilities, a medical wing, student club areas, a learning resource centre and computer laboratories. Five boarding houses accommodated up to 380 students, while residential house staff were provided with separate accommodation.

Alumni 
Welbeck College educated the following notable alumni in the British armed forces:
Brigadier Andrew Massey, Army officer
Lieutenant General Richard Cripwell Army officer
 Lieutenant General Sir David Bill, Army officer
 Lieutenant General Andrew Figgures, former Master-General of the Ordnance
 Lieutenant General Tyrone Urch, Army officer
 Major General Peter Ronald Davies, British Army Officer and animal welfare campaigner
 Lieutenant Colonel Dick Strawbridge, engineer, television presenter and environmentalist

 Pam Relph, Paralympic Gold medallist

References

Bibliography

External links 
 Official website, archived in August 2021
 Old Welbexian Association website

Sixth form colleges in Leicestershire
Boarding schools in Leicestershire
Defunct boarding schools in England
Defunct schools in Leicestershire
Military schools in the United Kingdom
Military academies of the United Kingdom
Member schools of the Headmasters' and Headmistresses' Conference
Educational institutions established in 1953
1953 establishments in England
Educational institutions disestablished in 2021
2021 disestablishments in England
State funded boarding schools in England